Phillip Whitehead (30 May 1937 – 31 December 2005) was a British Labour politician, television producer and writer.

Early life
Born in Matlock Bath, Derbyshire, he was adopted by a local family in Rowsley, and attended Lady Manners School in Bakewell and Exeter College, Oxford, where he obtained his BA degree.

Whitehead went up to Oxford following in his adoptive parents' footsteps as a Conservative. He was President of the Oxford University Conservative Association and the Oxford Union in 1961.

Career
Whitehead was an independent documentary producer in the early 1960s and later an editor with the BBC and ITV from 1967 to 1970.

House of Commons
After standing unsuccessfully at West Derbyshire in 1966, he represented Derby North as a Labour MP from 1970 to 1983, when he was defeated by the Conservative Greg Knight. He tried to win back the seat in 1987 but was beaten once again.

Whitehead was a member of several parliamentary committees:

 Member, Council of Europe/WEU 
 Member, Annan Committee on the Future of Broadcasting
 Member, Commons Select Committee on Home Affairs, which abolished 'sus'
 Front Bench Spokesman on Higher Education and the Arts

Back to television
After his defeat at the 1983 general election, Whitehead returned to television as a producer and director. He was also author of several books derived, with the exception of his Fabian essays, from the television series he produced:

 The Writing On The Wall: Britain in the Seventies (London: Michael Joseph, 1985); 
 Dynasty: The Nehrus and the Gandhis (1997; with Jad Adams)
 contributor to Changing States, Fabian Essays, Ruling Dimension
The Windsors—A Dynasty Revealed 1917–2000 (2000;;)
 Stalin, a Time for Judgement

In 1988 he was MacTaggart Memorial Lecturer at the Edinburgh TV Festival.

European Parliament
He was a Labour member of the European Parliament from 1994 to his death, first serving as MEP for Staffordshire East and Derby, and later as one of the members for the East Midlands.

On 23 July 2004 he was elected chair of the Parliamentary Committee on the Internal Market and Consumer Protection. He was also member of the European Parliament's African, Caribbean and Pacific Joint Parliamentary Assembly and chair of the European Parliamentary Labour Party.

A list of EP committees of which Whitehead was a member:

 Member, EP Committee for Environment, Public Health, Consumer Protection 
 Substitute member, EP Committee for Culture, Youth, Education, Media 
 Chair, European Parliament Consumer Intergroup 
 Member, Vice-President, EP delegation for relations with Czech Republic
 Member, EP delegation to EU Bulgaria Joint Parliamentary Committee 
 Member and co-ordinator, EP Committee of Enquiry into BSE
 Chair, European Parliamentary Labour Party 
 Member, EP Committee for Environment, Public Health and Consumer Protection 
 Substitute member, EP Committee for Culture, Youth, Media and Sport 
 Member, EP Temporary Committee on Foot and Mouth Disease 
 Member, EP delegation for relations with Czech Republic 
 Member, Consumer Forum Intergroup 
 Chair, Internal Market and Consumer Protection Committee
 Substitute Member, Environment, Public Health and Food Safety Committee
 Member, ACP-EU Joint Parliamentary Assembly
 Member, European Parliament delegation for relations with Romania

Other professional memberships held by Whitehead:

 Director, Brook Associates TV production company
 Chair of the Fabian Society 
 Council member and Chair of the Consumers' Association 
 Chairman of Statesman-Nation Publications

Death
He retained a close association with Derbyshire, especially the Bakewell area, throughout his life. Whitehead was taken ill on 31 December 2005 and died later that evening in a hospital in Chesterfield from a heart attack aged 68.

In recognition of his service to the city The Phillip Whitehead Memorial Library, a public library on Chaddesden Park in Derby, was opened in March 2013.

References

External links
 
 

1937 births
2005 deaths
Alumni of Exeter College, Oxford
BBC television producers
Members of the Parliament of the United Kingdom for constituencies in Derbyshire
Emmy Award winners
English television producers
Labour Party (UK) MEPs
Labour Party (UK) MPs for English constituencies
MEPs for England 1994–1999
MEPs for England 1999–2004
MEPs for England 2004–2009
National Union of Railwaymen-sponsored MPs
People from Derbyshire Dales (district)
Politics of Lincolnshire
Presidents of the Oxford Union
Presidents of the Oxford University Conservative Association
UK MPs 1970–1974
UK MPs 1974
UK MPs 1974–1979
UK MPs 1979–1983
Chairs of the Fabian Society